Vijay Kumar Khemka is an Indian politician from Bharatiya Janata Party, Bihar and a two term Member of Bihar Legislative Assembly from Purnia Assembly constituency.

References 

1959 births
Living people
Bihar MLAs 2015–2020
Bihar MLAs 2020–2025
Bharatiya Janata Party politicians from Bihar